Anderson Lawler (May 5, 1902 – April 6, 1959) was an American actor and producer in film and theatre who had a career lasting from the 1920s through the 1950s. He began on Broadway before moving to featured and supporting roles in Hollywood over a ten-year career at the very beginning of the talking-picture era. After the end of his acting career, Lawler moved to the production end of the film industry as well as becoming a producer of legitimate theater in the late 1940s and 1950s.

Early life
Lawler was born Sidney Lawler on May 5, 1902, in Russellville, Alabama, to Earnest H. and Dona C. Lawler. Prior to 1927, Lawler moved to New York City and changed his professional name to Anderson Lawler.

Career
In 1927 he had a featured role in the Broadway production Her First Affaire, which premiered at the Nora Bayes Theatre in August 1927. In 1929 he moved to Los Angeles, where he began his career in the film industry. His first role was in 1929's River of Romance. While in Hollywood, he appeared in almost thirty films during this time, mostly in supporting roles, before moving behind the scenes in 1939. Aside from his professional career, he was also popular with many Hollywood actors, including William Haines, George Cukor, Gary Cooper, and Katharine Hepburn.

Lawler produced the 1946 film Somewhere in the Night, which was directed by Joseph L. Mankiewicz and starred John Hodiak, Nancy Guild, and Lloyd Nolan. Lee Strasberg adapted the screenplay and was an assistant director on the project.  Shortly after this, both Lawler and Strasberg were transferred to the New York office of Twentieth Century-Fox. Lawler and Strasberg had a close friendship, Lawler becoming the godfather of Strasberg's daughter, Susan Strasberg. In New York, Lawler worked in Fox's talent department, but he also began a second career as a producer of legitimate theater. At least one of those plays, Oh Men, Oh Women, would be turned into a film by Fox in 1957.

Personal life and death
Lawler was gay, although he was frequently linked with women. He had a rumored homosexual affair with life-long friend and actor Gary Cooper. In 1935 he accompanied Kay Francis on a trip to Europe, ostensibly sent by the studios to keep her out of trouble. At one point, Walter Winchell started a rumor that the two were engaged.

Lawler purchased Donald L. Linder's house in West Hollywood, California, designed in the Streamline Moderne style by architect Edward B. Rust. When he moved to New York City, he rented it to actors Orson Welles and Rita Hayworth.

On April 6, 1959, Lawler died unexpectedly from a heart attack.

Filmography

(Per AFI database)

Half Marriage  (1929)
River of Romance  (1929)
A Lady to Love  (1930)
Only Saps Work  (1930)
Girls About Town  (1931)
American Madness  (1932)
Hollywood Speaks  (1932)
Let's Fall in Love  (1933)	
Ace of Aces  (1933)	
The Cheyenne Kid  (1933)
Beloved  (1934)
The Man Who Reclaimed His Head  (1934)
Let's Talk It Over  (1934)	
Riptide  (1934)
Public Hero No. 1  (1935)
The Return of Sophie Lang  (1936)	
The Adventurous Blonde  (1937)
Confession  (1937)	
Back in Circulation  (1937)
Empty Holsters  (1937)
Fly-Away Baby  (1937)
Alcatraz Island  (1937)
Accidents Will Happen  (1938)	
Heart of the North (1938)
The Invisible Menace  (1938)	
Daredevil Drivers  (1938)	
Mystery House  (1938)
Over the Wall  (1938)
Torchy Blane in Chinatown  (1939)
Somewhere in the Night (1946) - producer

References

External links

1902 births
1959 deaths
Male actors from Alabama
American male stage actors
American film producers
American theatre managers and producers
People from Russellville, Alabama
People from West Hollywood, California
20th-century American male actors
20th-century American businesspeople
American gay actors
LGBT people from Alabama
20th-century American LGBT people